Jonjo is a rare given Irish name. Notable people with the name include: 

Jonjo Dickman (born 1981), English footballer
Jonjo O'Neill (born 1952), Irish racehorse trainer
Jonjo O'Neill (actor) (born 1978), Irish actor
Jonjo Shelvey (born 1992), English footballer
Jonjoe Kenny (born 1997), English footballer